The following is a list of Argentine actress and singer Lali Espósito's awards and nominations. As of July 2022, Espósito has won 51 awards from 130 nominations.

Billboard Latin Music Awards
The Billboard Latin Music Awards are presented annually by Billboard magazine and recognize outstanding chart performances.

Buenos Aires Music Video Fest

Gardel Awards 
The Gardel Awards are presented annually by CAPIF. The awards are the Argentine equivalent of American Grammy Awards and British BRIT Awards. Espósito has won five awards.

Heat Latin Music Awards
The Heat Latin Music Awards are presented annually by HTV to reward the best of Latin music.

Latin American Music Awards
The Latin American Music Awards or Latin AMAs is an annual American music award that is presented by Telemundo to award outstanding achievements for artists in the Latin music industry. It is the Spanish-language counterpart of the American Music Awards (AMAs).

Lo Nuestro Awards 
The Lo Nuestro Awards are awarded annually by Univision.

Martin Fierro Awards 
The Martin Fierro Awards are awarded annually by APTRA. Espósito has won one of two nominations.

MTV Awards

MTV Europe Music Awards 
The MTV Europe Music Awards was established in 1994 by MTV Europe to award the music videos from European and international artists. Espósito has won Five times.

MTV Millennial Awards
The MTV Millennial Awards or MTV MIAWs, held annually in Mexico, were established in 2013 by MTV Latin America to award music artists. Espósito has won seven awards from fifteen nominations.

MTV Millennial Awards Brazil
The MTV Millennial Awards Brazil or MTV MIAWs BR, held annually in Brazil, were established in 2018 by MTV Brasil to celebrate music, television and internet artists.

Nickelodeon Kids Choice Awards
The Nickelodeon Kids' Choice Awards is an annual award show launched by Nickelodeon. Espósito has won one award from five nominations.

Kids' Choice Awards Argentina
The Kids' Choice Awards Argentina was an annual award show launched by Nickelodeon Latin America. Espósito has won thirteen awards from eighteen nominations.

Kids' Choice Awards Mexico
The Kids' Choice Awards Mexico is an annual award show launched by Nickelodeon Latin America.

Platino Awards
The Platino Awards, known in Spanish as Premios Platino del Cine Iberoamericano, are Ibero-America's annual film awards. They honor excellence in cinematic achievements.

Premios Cilsa
The Cilsa Awards are special awards presented by CILSA to honor celebrities that fight for a better world working selflessly with non-profit institutions. Espósito has won one award.

Premios Juventud
The Premios Juventud are awarded annually by Univision to honor pop culture of young Hispanic and Latino Americans.

Produ Awards
The Produ Awards are awarded annually by PRODU to honor to the best television productions in all of Latin America

Quiero Awards 
The Quiero Awards are awarded by Argentine TV channel "Quiero TV" to prize music artists. Lali has won nine awards from thirty-five nominations.

Tato Awards
The Tato Awards are an Argentine awards for television, released by CAPIT since 2009. Espósito has won one award from three nominations.

Tu Música Urbano Awards
The Tu Música Urbano Awards are presented annually by the Telemundo.

Tudo Information Awards
The Tudo Information Award is a Brazilian award show held annually by Tudo Information, a news and entertainment website.

SEC Awards
The SEC Awards are awarded annually by Brazilian news site Séries em Cena to the best of the film, television and music industry in Brazil.

Seoul International Drama Awards
The Seoul International Drama Awards is an annual award show for excellence in television drama production based in Seoul, South Korea. For the 2016 ceremony, Espósito received one nomination.

Silver Condor Awards 
The Silver Condor Awards are presented annually by the Argentine Film Critics Association (ACCA). The awards are the Argentine equivalent of American Academy Awards.

Viña del Mar International Song Festival
The Viña del Mar International Song Festival is a music festival that has been held annually during the 3rd week of February in Viña del Mar, Chile. Started in 1960, it is the oldest and largest music festival in Latin America.

Popularity charts

References 

Awards and nominations
Esposito, Lali